The Draughts-64 World Championship is the world championship for Brazilian and Russian draughts. The championship has been organized by the World Draughts Federation (FMJD) since 1985, the last few championship organized by the International Draughts Federation (IDF). The first championship was in Brazilian draughts. In 1993 the first championship in Russian draughts was held.
Since 1993 took place Draughts-64 World Championship in blitz, since 1998 in rapid.

Classic

Rapid

Blitz

References

External links 
World Men Championship//section-64

Draughts world championships
Draughts competitions